James McConkey Robinson (June 30, 1924 – March 22, 2016) was an American scholar who retired as Professor Emeritus of Religion at Claremont Graduate University, Claremont, California, specializing in New Testament Studies and Nag Hammadi Studies. He was a member of the Jesus Seminar and arguably the most prominent Q and Nag Hammadi library scholar of the twentieth century. He was also a major contributor to The International Q Project, acting as an editor for most of their publications. Particularly, he laid the groundwork for John S. Kloppenborg's foundational work into the compositional history of Q, by arguing its genre as an ancient wisdom collection. He also was the permanent secretary of UNESCO's International Committee for the Nag Hammadi codices.

Biography
Robinson was educated at Davidson College (BA), Columbia Theological Seminary (BD), University of Basel (D.Theol., 1952), and Princeton Theological Seminary (PhD, 1955). Robinson was an ordained Presbyterian minister. While at Basel, Robinson studied with Karl Barth and Oscar Cullmann. But during that time he also would take the train to Marburg, Germany, in order to hear Rudolf Bultmann lecture at the University of Marburg. It was in that context that he began to be shaped by Bultmann's existentialist theology and philosophy. His Basel dissertation was never published, but his Princeton dissertation was published as The Problem of History in Mark (1957). His first teaching position was at Candler School of Theology at Emory University (1952-1958) in Atlanta, Georgia. He then taught at Claremont (first at Claremont School of Theology [1958-1964] and then Claremont Graduate School later University [1964-1999]); at the Graduate School he held an endowed chair, the Arthur Letts, Jr., Professor of Religion. He was the recipient of a Guggenheim Fellowship in 1970. He was also the Director of the Institute for Antiquity and Christianity.

He was the son of William Childs Robinson (1897-1982), who taught church history and apologetics at Columbia Theological Seminary. His brother William taught New Testament at Perkins School of Theology and then Andover Newton Theological School.

He has received criticism from philosopher and apologist William Lane Craig regarding his views on Jesus' resurrection appearances. Robinson argued that these appearances had their origins in second-century Gnosticism. Craig argues that there is no reason to believe that all of these experiences were luminous, and even if they were, that they were interpreted as non-physical appearances. Robinson died in March 2016 at the age of 91.

Works

Books

Edited by

Chapters

Bibliography
 - an additional biographical source

Obituary
Charles W. Hedrick. "Liberator of the Nag Hammadi Library." Biblical Archaeology Society, July 16, 2016.

References

1924 births
2016 deaths
Place of birth missing
American biblical scholars
New Testament scholars
Claremont Graduate University faculty
Members of the Jesus Seminar